USS Accohanoc (YTB/YTM-545/TD-25) was a  in the service of the United States Navy, named after a tribe of the Powhatan confederacy.

Construction
Accohanoc was laid down on 12 April 1945, at Morris Heights, New York, by Consolidated Shipbuilding Corp.; launched on 9 July 1945; and delivered to the Navy on 28 December 1945.

Service history
By that time, however, World War II had ended and the Navy's need for all types of ships had greatly diminished. Consequently, instead of joining the Fleet, the large harbor tug was placed in reserve at Green Cove Springs, Florida, and remained inactive for 16 months.

She was finally placed in service in May 1947, for duty in the 7th Naval District, plying the waters of Florida. When the 7th Naval District was dissolved on 1 September 1948, Accohanoc reported to the commandant of its successor, the enlarged 6th Naval District. That assignment endured for almost 40 years. In February 1962, the tug was reclassified a medium harbor tug and redesignated YTM-545.

In February 1987, Accohanoc was placed out of service and her name was struck from the Navy List. She was transferred to the Maritime Administration (MARAD) on 10 June 1987.

Accohanoc was used in the James River Reserve Fleet, redesignated TD-25, until she was swamped 16 September 1999, by Hurricane Floyd. Her final disposition is unknown, but possibly scrapped.

References

Bibliography

External links
 
 

 

Tugs of the United States Navy
Cold War auxiliary ships of the United States
Ships built in Morris Heights, Bronx
1945 ships